A list of windmills in Schleswig-Holstein, Germany.

{| class="wikitable sortable"
|-
! Location
! Name of mill
! Type
! Built
!class="unsortable"|Notes
!class="unsortable"|Photograph
|-
| Achtrup
| Jenny
| Galerieholländer
| 
| House conversion.
| 
|-
| Amrum
| Amrumer Mühle
| Erdholländer
| 1771
| 
| 
|-
| Amrum
| Bertha
| Galerieholländer
| 1893
| House conversion.
| 
|-
| Ascheberg
| Langenrader Mühle,Sventana
| Galerieholländer
| 1860
| 
| 
|-
| Barlt
| Ursula
| Galerieholländer
| 1875
| 
| 
|-
| Beidenfleth
| Hoffnung
| Galerieholländer
| 1813
| Destroyed by fire 17 April 2016.
| 
|-
| Bergedorf
| Glück Zu
| Galerieholländer
| 1831
| 
| 
|-
| Bergenhusen
| Gisela
| Kellerholländer
| 1922
| Moved from Meldorf. House converted in 1978.
| 
|-
| Bergenhusen
| Margaretha
| Holländerwindmühle
| 1891
| 
| 
|-
| Borgsum
| Borigsem
| Galerieholländer
| 1991
| 
| 
|-
| Braak
| Braaker Mühle
| Galerieholländer
| 1850
| 
| 
|-
| Brodau
| Brodauer Mühle
| Galerieholländer
| 1864
| Burnt down 17 November 2005
| 
|-
| Dellstedt
| Fortuna
| Galerieholländer
| 1926
| 
| 
|-
| Dörpling
| Fortuna
| Kellerholländer
| 1853
| 
| 
|-
| Eckernförde
| Grüne Mühle
| Galerieholländer
| 1829
| Demolished 1911
| 
|-
| Eddelak
| Gott Mit Uns
| Galerieholländer
| 1865
| 
| 
|-
| Eutin
| Moder Grau
| Galerieholländer
| 1850
| 
| 
|-
| Eutin
| Anna
| Galerieholländer
| 1803
| Dismantled 1902, rebuilt at Süderhastedt 1903
| 
|-
| Flensburg
| Bergmühle
| Galerieholländer
| 1792
| 
| 
|-
| Flensburg
| St. Johannis Mühle
| Galerieholländer
| 1808
| 
| 
|-
| Fockendorf
| Fockendorfer Mühle
| Spinnkopfmühle
| 1850
| Moved to Molfsee in 1966
| 
|-
| Friedrichskoog
| Vergissmeinnicht
| Galerieholländer
| 1860
| 
| 
|-
| Garding
| Fortuna
| Galerieholländer
| 1870
| 
| 
|-
| Garding
| Emanuel
| Erdholländer
| 1857
| House conversion.
| 
|-
| Grebin
| Grebiner Mühle,Wagria
| Kellerholländer
| 1851
| 
| 
|-
| Gettorf
| Gettorfer Mühle
| Galerieholländer
| 1869
| 
| 
|-
| Grödersby
| Grödersbyer Mühle
| Galerieholländer
| 1888
| converted to vacation rental apartments
| 
|-
| Groß Wittensee
| Auguste
| Kellerholländer
| 1874
| 
| 
|-
| Hamburg
| Feldentwasserungsmühle
| Kokermühle
| c. 1780
| 
| 
|-
| Hamburg
| Riepenburger Mühle
| Galerieholländer
| 1828
| 
| 
|-
| Hamburg
| Osdorf
| Galerieholländer
| 1890
| 
| 
|-
| Hamburg
| Reitbrook
| Galerieholländer
| 
| 
| 
|-
| Hamburg
| Johanna
| Galerieholländer
| 1875
| 
| 
|-
| Hamfelde
| Pirsch Mühle
| Galerieholländer
| 1876
| 
| 
|-
| Hasselberg
| Johannesmühle
| Galerieholländer
| ''1869| House conversion.
| 
|-
| Hemmingstedt
| Margaretha| Kellerholländer
| 1858| 
| 
|-
| Henstedt-Ulzburg
| Götzburg| Kellerholländer
| 
| 
| 
|-
| Hochdonn
| Aurora| Galerieholländer
| 1883| 
| 
|-
| Hollingstedt
| Hollingstedter Mühle
| Galerieholländer
| 1865| Moved to Molfsee in 1973
| 
|-
| Husberg
| Elfriede| Galerieholländer
| 1838| 
| 
|-
| Itzehoe
| Suder Mühle| Galerieholländer
| 1870| 
| 
|-
| Joldelund
| Joldeluder Mühle| Kellerholländer
| 1771| House conversion.
| 
|-
| Kappeln
| Amanda| Galerieholländer
| 1888| Tallest windmill in Schleswig-Holstein.
| 
|-
| Keitum
| 
| Galerieholländer
| 1870s
| Demolished 1911
| 
|-
| Klein Barkau
| Klein Barkauer Mühle| Galerieholländer
| 1870| 
| 
|-
| Kogel
| Marie| Erdholländer
| 1898| 
| 
|-
| Kollmar
| 
| Galerieholländer
| 1815| Burnt down 19 November 2003
| 
|-
| Krokau
| Krokauer Mühle| Galerieholländer
| 1872| 
| 
|-
| Krumstedt
| Olivia| Kellerholländer
| 1848| 
| 
|-
| Langenhorn
| Westermöhl| Galerieholländer
| 1859| 
| 
|-
| Lauenburg
| Lauenburger Mühle| Galerieholländer
| 
| 
| 
|-
| Lepahn
| Lepahner Mühle| Galerieholländer
| c. 1885
| 
| 
|-
| Lemkenhafen
| Jachen Flünk| Galerieholländer
| 1787| 
| 
|-
| Lindau
| Lindaumühlenholz| Galerieholländer
| 1837| House conversion.
| 
|-
| Loose
| 
| Galerieholländer
| 1858| Demolished in ????, New mill built on base in 2001 (see below)
| 
|-
| Loose
| Mohrbergmühle| Galerieholländer
| 2001| Originally built at Rostock, Mecklenburg-Vorpommern in 1864.
| 
|-
| Marne
| 
| Galerieholländer
| 
| 
| 
|-
| Medelby
| Vanessa| Galerieholländer
| 1859| 
| 
|-
| Meldorf
| Nordermühle| Kellerholländer
| 1863| 
| 
|-
| Meldorf
| Südermühle| Galerieholländer
| 
| 
| 
|-
| Meldorf
| 
| Kellerholländer
| 1887| Moved to Bergenhusen, 1922.
| 
|-
| Molfsee
| Algermissener Mühle| Bockwindmühle
| 1965| Moved from Algermissen, Lower Saxony.
| 
|-
| Molfsee
| Hollingstedter Mühle| Galerieholländer
| 1973| Moved from Hollingstedt.
| 
|-
| Molfsee
| Fockendorfer Mühle| Spinnkopfmühle
| 1966| Moved from Fockendorf.
| 
|-
| Munkbrarup
| Hoffnung| Kellerholländer
| 1868| 
| 
|-
| Neufeld
| Immanuel| Kellerholländer
| 1850| 
| 
|-
| Nieby
| Charlotte| Kellerholländer
| 1826| 
| 
|-
| Nordermeldorf
| Thalingburen| Galerieholländer
| 1882| House conversion
| 
|-
| Nordstrand
| Engel| Galerieholländer
| 1891| 
| 
|-
| Nübbel
| Anna| Kellerholländer
| 1904| 
| 
|-
| Nübelfeld
| Hoffnung| Kellerholländer
| 1841| House conversion
| 
|-
| Oldenswort
| Catharina| Kellerholländer
| 1786| House conversion.
| 
|-
| Oldsum
| Oldsumer Mühle| Galerieholländer
| 1901| House conversion.
| 
|-
| Osterbargum
| Aeolus| Galerieholländer
| 1887| 
| 
|-
| Pellworm
| Nordermühle| Galerieholländer
| 1777| 
| 
|-
| Petersdorf - Fehmarn
| Südermühle| Galerieholländer
| 1893| Converted to restaurant.
| 
|-
| Reinbek
| Hannemann's Mühle| Galerieholländer
| 1996| Moved from Wagersrott.
| 
|-
| Rieseby
| Anna| Galerieholländer
| 1994| 
| 
|-
| Sankt Michaelisdonn
| Edda| Kellerholländer
| 1842| 
| 
|-
| Schönberg
| Schönberger Mühle| Galerieholländer
| 1827| 
| 
|-
| Siebenbäumen
| Siebenbäumener Mühle| Galerieholländer
| 1885| 
| 
|-
| Siek
| 
| Galerieholländer
| 1901| 
| 
|-
| Söby-Holzdorf
| Soby Mühle| Galerieholländer
| 1886| 
| 
|-
| Sörup
| Renata| Galerieholländer
| 1883| 
| 
|-
| Stördorf
| Schöpfmühle Honigfleth| Kokermühle
| 
| Only hollow post mill in working order in Germany.
| 
|-
| Strübbel
| 
| Holländerwindmühle
| 
| Moved to Ditzum, Lower Saxony in 1992.
| 
|-
| Struckum
| Fortuna| Sockelgeschoßholländer
| 1806| 
| 
|-
| Struxdorf
| Hollmühle| Galerieholländer
| 1843| 
| 
|-
| Süderhastedt
| Anna| Galerieholländer
| 1904| 
|  
|-
| Tarp
| Antje| Galerieholländer
| 1882| 
| 
|-
| Timmendorfer Strand
| Der Reporter| Galerieholländer
| 1846| 
| 
|-
| Todenbüttel
| Senta| Galerieholländer
| 1871| House conversion
| 
|-
| Uetersen
| Langes Mühle
| Sockelgeschoßholländer
| c. 1772
| Burnt down 1889. Converted base used as café.
| 
|-
| Unewatt
| Fortuna| Galerieholländer
| 1878| 
| 
|-
| Wagersrott
| 
| Galerieholländer
| 1870| Moved to Reinbek, 1996.
| 
|-
| Wangels
| Farve| Erdholländer
| 1828| House conversion
| 
|-
| Weddingstedt
| Aurora| Galerieholländer
| 1832| 
| 
|-
| Westerdiechstrich
| Margaretha,Von Vorn| Sockelgeschoßholländer
| 1845| Converted to hotel/restaurant.
| 
|-
| Westerhever
| 
| Galerieholländer
| 1786| Moved to Rieseby 1994
| 
|-
| Westerholz
| Steinadler| Galerieholländer
| 1876| 
| 
|-
| Wilster
| Aurora,Rumflether Mühle| Galerieholländer
| 1872| 
| 
|-
| Wöhrden
| Germania| Sockelgeschoßholländer
| 1847| House conversion
| 
|-
| Wrixum
| Wrixumer Mühle| Kellerholländer
| 1851| 
| 
|-
| Wyk
| Venti Amica| Galerieholländer
| 1879| House converted in 1922
| 
|-
| Wyk
| Pfahlmühle| Bockwindmühle
| 1924| 
| 
|-
| Zarpen
| Zarpener Mühle| Gallerieholländer
| c. 1890
| 
| 
|}

Notes

Known building dates are in bold''' text. Non-bold text denotes first known date.

References

Windmills
Schleswig-Holstein